Paul Stephane Lionel Biligha (born 31 May 1990) is an Cameroonian-Italian professional basketball player for Olimpia Milano of the Italian Lega Basket Serie A (LBA) and the EuroLeague. Standing at 2.00 m (6 ft. 7 in.), he plays at the center position.

Professional career
Biligha was born in Perugia, Italy in 1990 into a family of Italian and Cameroonian heritage.

He started playing in Cameroon where he lived from the age of 8 to 16. Once back in Italy, he grew as a basketball player in the Florence youth team and later Casalpusterlengo, Verolanuova, Crema and Pavia.

In summer 2012 Biligha signed with Sidigas Avellino in LBA, where he stayed for two seasons. In 2014 went to Basket Ferentino in Serie A2 Basket.

On 26 June 2015 Biligha returned in LBA with a two-year contract with Vanoli Cremona.

In July 2017 he became a player of 2017 Italian League champions, Umana Reyer Venezia. In May 2018, he won the FIBA Europe Cup with Reyer.

He signed with Olimpia Milano for the 2019–20 season.

National team career
Bilingha made his debut with the Under-20 Italian national under-20 team during the 2010 FIBA Europe Under-20 Championship, playing eight games.

In 2017, he made it into the final squad of the Italian national team. He participated in EuroBasket 2017, held in Israel.

References

External links

Paul Biligha at fiba.basketball
Paul Biligha at eurobasket.com
Paul Biligha at legabasket.it 

1990 births
Living people
2019 FIBA Basketball World Cup players
Basket Ferentino players
Centers (basketball)
Italian men's basketball players
Italian people of Cameroonian descent
Italian sportspeople of African descent
Lega Basket Serie A players
Olimpia Milano players
Pallacanestro Pavia players
Sportspeople from Perugia
Reyer Venezia players
S.S. Felice Scandone players
Vanoli Cremona players